The Night Nurse is a 1978 Australian television film about the relationship between a former opera star and her night nurse.

It was produced by Bruning's Gemini Productions.

Plot
Prudence wants to become independent of her artist ex-boyfriend Rick, and so she arrives at the grand home of The Diva, a once famous opera singer, to interview for a night nurse position. Instantly hired by the septuagenarian, she soon begins to experience odd things. And the other staff member, stone faced Clara, shows Prudence nothing but resentment, and clearly wants her gone. Prudence soon learns that all is not what it seems in this household, leading her to a ghastly discovery and to unearth dangerous secrets from the past.

Cast
Davina Whitehouse as the Diva
Kay Taylor as Clara
Gary Day as Rick Barrett
Kate Fitzpatrick as Prudence Simpson
Reg Gillam as Marsden
Edward Howell as Morphett
Max Meldrum as Dr Leeds

Production
Bruning had made four TV movies for Channel Seven which had rated well. This prompted the network to commission six more from Bruning of which The Night Nurse was the first. These were made for a cost of $750,000. "It's the largest order of locally made product ever," said Greg Brown of Seven "and we are sure viewers will be impressed."

Reception
Don Groves of the Sydney Morning Herald called it "an old fashioned blood curdling thriller" and "a first rate yarn".

References

External links
The Night Nurse at IMDb
The Night Nurse at Letterboxd
The Night Nurse at Oz Movies
Review at Video Tape Swap Shop

The Night Nurse at Peter Malone Site
The Night Nurse at AustLit
The Night Nurse at National Film and Sound Archive

Australian television films
1977 television films
1977 films
Films about nurses
Films directed by Igor Auzins
1970s English-language films